Blades of Blood (lit. "Like the Moon Escaping from the Clouds") is a 2010 South Korean action drama film directed by Lee Joon-ik. The film is based on Park Heung-yong's graphic novel Like the Moon Escaping from the Clouds.

Plot 
In the late 16th century, the kingdom of Joseon is thrown into chaos by the threat of a Japanese invasion. Lee Mong-hak (Cha Seung-won), an illegitimate offspring from a cadet family of the ruling dynasty, and legendary blind swordsman Hwang Jeong-hak (Hwang Jung-min) were once allies who dreamed of stamping out the Japanese invasion, social inequality and corruption, and creating a better world. Persecuted by the court, Lee forms a rebel army in hopes of overthrowing the inept king and taking the throne himself. Lee is willing to kill recklessly and betray former comrades to forge his bloody path to the palace. Kyeon-ja is the bastard child of a family killed by Mong-hak.  Hwang Jeong-hak saves him from an injury caused by Mong-hak.  Together the two search for Mong-hak in order to confront and kill him.

After Mong-hak's Great Alliance rebel army defeat a large government military force, Hwang Jeong-hak confronts him alone.  After a lengthy battle, Mong-hak's skill proves too much and the blind swordsman falls. Kyeon-ja, finding Jeong-hak dead, decides to head to Seoul, the capital of Joseon and final destination of Mong-hak. While, Mong-hak, despite finding out that Japanese forces are approaching and will slaughter and pillage every villagers and settlements they encounter, orders the Great Alliance army to press on towards to Seoul, abandoning the commoners who gathered to rebel camp seeking protection from invading forces. The rebels take Seoul, but are confused and frustrated as the king has already abandoned the capital and the palace lies forlorn. Kyeon-ja, who has arrived at the palace before the rebels came, confronts Mong-hak as he approaches the throne pavilion. A few moments later the Japanese army arrives and begins massacring the rebel army with their arquebuses. Kyeon-ja succeeds in killing Mong-hak then dies at the hands of the Japanese army.

Cast 

Hwang Jung-min as Hwang Jeong-hak
Cha Seung-won as Lee Mong-hak
Baek Sung-hyun as Kyeon-ja
Han Ji-hye as Baek-ji
Lee Dol-hyung as nobleman Song
Kim Chang-wan as King Seonjo
Song Young-chang as Han Shin-gyun
Yeom Dong-hyun as nobleman Park
Jung Gyu-soo as tableware maker
Shin Jung-geun as nobleman Yoo
Ryu Seung-ryong as nobleman Jung
Lee Hae-young as Han Pil-joo
Yang Young-jo as Lee Jang-gak
Jung Min-sung as Hwang Yoon-gil
Lee Jae-gu as Magistrate Choi
Jung Jae-heon as executor
Kang Hyun-joong as Daedong mob subordinate
Han Seung-do as police chief
Ji Il-joo as scholar
Lee Sol-gu as prison guard
Jo Kyung-hoon as assassin
Choi Dae-sung as Im Chul-min's subordinate
Park Jin-woo as Kim Sung-il
Yeon Young-geol as public officer
Kim Byung-oh as low public officer 4
Shin Young-sik as nobleman
Kim Young-hoon as executor
Kim Sang-ho as Park Dol-seok
Kim Bo-yeon as gisaeng's mother
Min-young as gisaeng
Kim Sung-hoon as executioner

Production 
Actor Hwang Jung-min expressed his difficulty playing a blind character in the film. Hwang went to schools for blind people to observe their movements but stated that "it still wasn't an easy role to play".

Release 
Blades of Blood premiered on April 29, 2010, in South Korea. It opened at number two in the box office, grossing  on 603 screens.

The film had its international premiere at New York Asian Film Festival on July 8, 2010, where it was the festival's closing film. Lee Joon-ik won the Jury Award for Best Director at the Fantasia Festival in Montreal Canada. Blades of Blood was one of six films considered as Korea's submission for the foreign-language Oscar award.

Reception 
Film Business Asia gave the film a rating of seven out of ten, praising action and characters calling it a "cut above most Korean swordplay dramas." Variety gave the film a mixed review, stating that "political infighting on the eve of a Japanese invasion is told with unnecessarily broad, imagistic strokes that let character-generated conflicts slip between the blades" as well as that "the film easily outdoes numerous gimmicky f/x extravaganzas, explaining its early pickup by several European and Asian distribs."

References

External links 
 
 Blades of Blood at Naver
 
 
 

2010 films
2010 action drama films
South Korean action drama films
South Korean historical action films
South Korean martial arts films
Films about blind people
Films about rebellions
Films about revolutions
Films set in the 16th century
Films set in the Joseon dynasty
Films set in Seoul
Films based on manhwa
Films directed by Lee Joon-ik
2010s Korean-language films
Live-action films based on comics
2010 martial arts films
2010s South Korean films